Group A is the first of three groups of the 2022 AFC Women's Asian Cup that took place from 20 to 26 February 2022. The group competition consists of China PR, Chinese Taipei, hosts India and Iran. The top two teams automatically qualify for the top eight knockout stage, while third place is comparatively evaluated to other third-placed teams based on the football ranking system for the last two berths. The two teams that advanced are China PR and Chinese Taipei. Although Iran finished third in this set, they failed to make the quarter-finals as they are comparatively last to the other third-place teams.

Teams

Standings

Matches

China PR vs Chinese Taipei

India vs Iran

Iran vs China PR

Chinese Taipei vs India

India vs China PR

Chinese Taipei vs Iran

Discipline

Fair play points would have been used as tiebreakers in the group if the overall and head-to-head records of teams were tied, or if teams had the same record in the ranking of third-placed teams. These were calculated based on yellow and red cards received in all group matches as follows:

 yellow card = 1 point
 red card as a result of two yellow cards = 3 points
 direct red card = 3 points
 yellow card followed by direct red card = 4 points

References

External links
, the-AFC.com

Group A